The Savage Land (原野 Yuanye) is a 1987 Chinese-language western-style opera by composer Jin Xiang to a libretto by Wan Fang (万方 born 1952) after her own father Cao Yu's 1937 play The Wilderness (also 原野 Yuanye). Shenzhen Youth Opera presented Jin Xiang's work in 2016.

References

Chinese western-style operas
Operas
1987 operas
Operas based on plays
Operas set in China